Henry Crosoer (1765–?) was an English cricketer of the late 18th century who played for Kent.  His name was sometimes given as Crozoer.

Crosoer was born at Bridge, Kent and seems to have been a wicketkeeper-batsman. He made eight known first-class appearances for Kent sides between 1786 and 1790.

References

English cricketers
Kent cricketers
English cricketers of 1701 to 1786
1765 births
Year of death unknown
English cricketers of 1787 to 1825
East Kent cricketers
People from Bridge, Kent
Wicket-keepers